NR1 Dance Hits 2015 is the 2015 version of the dance hits compilation albums by Number 1 FM which are compiled every year. After its release by the label Yeni Dünya Müzik, the album has been successful in the Turkish Charts. Famous artists like Inna, Otilia, Akcent, Alexandra Stan and Milk & Sugar are on this album.

Track listing 

 Otilia - Bilionera
 Akcent feat. Liv - Faina
 Inna feat. Marian Hill - Diggy Down
 Alexandra Stan - Dance
 Kadebostany - Castle In The Snow
 Milk & Sugar with Barbara Tucker - Needin U
 Mert Hakan feat. Serel - Get Up And Party
 Onur Betin feat. Kaan Akalın & Asena Ömür - Fool Around
 Deorro - Five Hours
 Mr. Saik - Contra La Pared
 Enca - Play My Game (A Po Tpelqen)
 Martin Tungevaag - Wicked Wonderland
 Dave Stiller - Stay Away (Asteroïds)
 Vekonyz - The Way I Do
 Mihai Toma - Flutaka
 R.I.O. feat. U-Jean - One In A Million
 Sarah Jsun feat. Alexander Shiva - My Place
 Lariss - Dale Papi
 Sunrise Inc feat. Master Mc - Muevete
 Nicola Fasano & Miami Rockets - Banned

Charts

External links 
 NR1 Dance Hits 2015 on iTunes.

DnR (TR) Purchase.

References 

2015 compilation albums